Echinozoa is a subphylum of free-living echinoderms in which the body is or originally was a modified globe with meridional symmetry. Echinozoans lack arms, brachioles, or other appendages, and do not at any time exhibit pinnate structure. Their two extant classes are the sea urchins and the sea cucumbers.

See also 
List of echinodermata orders

References

 
Animal subphyla